Anga was a kingdom on the eastern Indian subcontinent from  12th to 6th century BCE.

Anga may also refer to:

 Anga Kingdom, a kingdom in Indian epic literature
 Anga, Gotland, a settlement on the Swedish island of Gotland
Anga (name)
 Miguel "Angá" Díaz, a Cuban percussionist
 Anga people, an ethnic group in Nigeria
 Jain Anga, a 'department' of the Jain sacred texts, the Agamas
 , the word for Karuka in the Huli and Duna languages
 Anga, a fictional character in The Lion King franchise

See also 
 Angas (disambiguation)
 Ange (disambiguation)